Starfish is a 2016 British drama film written and directed by Bill Clark and starring Tom Riley and Joanne Froggatt.

Principal photography began on 4 December 2015 in Rutland. It was theatrically released in the United Kingdom on 28 October 2016.

Cast 
 Tom Riley as Tom Ray
 Joanne Froggatt as Nicola Ray
 Michele Dotrice as Jean
 Phoebe Nicholls as Tom's Mother

Production 
On 6 February 2015, it was announced that Bill Clark would direct a true story drama film Starfish about a married couple Tom and Nicola Ray. Joanne Froggatt would produce the film along with Pippa Cross through CrossDay Productions Ltd, Mel Paton through Origami Films, and Ros Hubbard through What's The Story.

Principal photography on the film began on 4 December 2015 in Rutland, England.

Tom and  Nic Ray published the book Starfish - One Family's Tale of Triumph After Tragedy (John Blake Publishing Ltd, 2017) .

References

External links 
 Starfish at Movie Review World
 

2016 films
British drama films
2016 drama films
Drama films based on actual events
Films about amputees
Films shot in England
2010s English-language films
2010s British films